The following is a list of episodes of ABS-CBN's Minsan Lang Kita Iibigin. This soap opera premiered on March 7, 2011, that centers on two separated twin brothers; a soldier and a rebel. It originally aired on 8:20–9:00 pm Monday to Friday time slot until June 6, 2011, when it was moved to 9:00–10:00 pm to give way for Guns and Roses. Since the time slot was changed, the ratings dropped as compared to Season 1 with an average of 30 million viewers but still reigns on its new timeslot with an average of 25 million viewers nightly. However the show regained its original audience in the last two weeks of airing, despite its late time slot.

Series overview

Episodes Summary

Season 1
This season consisted of 58 episodes.

Season 2
This is the second and final season of the series and consisted of 60 episodes.

Webisodes
On the official website of Minsan Lang Kita Iibigin, a series of previously unreleased footage  were posted.

Trivia 
All episodes begins with the word "Minsan" meaning "Once" to emphasize the series' title.
Some episode titles are named after series/songs that the actors playing a main or supporting role have been associated with.
The series is considered to be one of the highest-rated series of ABS-CBN beating all its competition from other networks namely I ♥ You Pare!, Captain Barbell, Dwarfina, Machete, Munting Heredera, Amaya and Time of My Life of the GMA Network and Babaeng Hampaslupa and The Sisters of TV5.
Minsan May Simula (Season 1, Episode 1) is the pilot episode and is the second highest-rated episode in the series with a 38.7% ratings share earning first place of the night.
Minsan Lang Nasa Bahay (Season 1, Episode 2) is named after a line by Lorna Tolentino playing Alondra Sebastiano-Del Tierro.
Minsan Mong Mahalin Ang Sarili Mo, Para Malaman Mo Kung Gano Kahirap (Season 1, Episode 24) is named after a line by Maja Salvador with the role of Kaye "Krista" Villanueva, with the addition of "Minsan" besides it.
Minsan Maalaala Mo Kaya (Season 1, Episode 21) is a landmark episode where the series goes back in time 21 years before and the crime that became one of the major secrets throughout the series, it is named after the long-running anthology Maalaala Mo Kaya starring Coco Martin, Maja Salvador, Andi Eigenmann, Martin del Rosario, Lorna Tolentino, John Estrada, Tonton Gutierrez and Boots Anson-Roa with the addition of the word "Minsan"
Minsan Lang Nagmahal, Sa Maling Tao Pa (Season 1, Episode 26) is named after a line by Boots Anson-Roa playing Remedios "Elena" Sebastiano.
Minsan Buhay Ang Utang, Buhay Ang Kabayaran (Season 1, Episode 34) is named after a quote by Tonton Gutierrez with the role of Tomas "Bernabe" Sta. Maria, with the addition of "Minsan" besides it.
Minsan Muling Nagsama (Season 1, Episodes 41-43) are landmark episodes and the only three-part saga in the series and centers around the soldiers and rebels facing each other and realising that they've seen and in fact loved one another.
Minsan Tayo'y Magkalayo (Season 1, Episode 57) is named after the 2010 series Kung Tayo'y Magkakalayo a Coco Martin and Ronaldo Valdez starrer with the word "Kung" replaced with "Minsan", the episode revolved around Amy Austria-Ventura's character Lora "Rosa" Sebastiano who has gone missing, this is due to the actress Ventura's health issues, she comes back in Season 2, Episode 19 near the end revealing the reason of her absence.
Minsan Nang Dahil Sa Pag-ibig (Season 2, Episode 5) is named after the song from the show's soundtrack with the addition of "Minsan" and is also the first time the song is played in the background, sung by Bugoy Drilon, the episode is also the third highest-rated episode of the series with a 37.1% ratings share earning third place
Minsan Kunin Mo Na Ang Lahat Sa Akin (Season 2, Episode 6) is named after the song from the show's soundtrack with the addition of "Minsan" and is also the first time the song is played throughout the series, sung by Angeline Quinto.
Minsan May Isang Kaibigan (Webisode 4) is the final webisode of the series uploaded on the first of July.
Minsan Lang May Mamatay (Season 2, Episode 41) is a landmark episode where the character of Remedios Sebastiano played by Boots Anson-Roa passes away.
Despite its late timeslot change, the show proved to be one of the highest-rated series of ABS-CBN in 2011, still holding a decent number of viewers compared to its rival program Munting Heredera of the GMA Network; because of this the show was to be extended but was not pushed through because of the networks hectic line-up and several follow-up programs for the year.
Minsan Manirahan Sa Dating Bahay (Season 2, Episode 42) earned the series' first and only sixth place earning 23.2% ratings share.
Minsan Walang Tatakas Sa Paghihiganti (Season 2, Episode 43) is the series' lowest-rated episode of the series with 22.2% ratings share earning the show's first and only seventh place.
Minsan May Impostor (Season 2, Episode 45) is named after the 2010 series Impostor starring Maja Salvador, with the addition of the word "Minsan".
Minsan Walang Kapalit (Season 2, Episode 46) is named after the 2007 series Walang Kapalit starring Amy Austria-Ventura, with the addition of the word "Minsan".
Minsan Dahil May Isang Ikaw (Season 2, Episode 47) is named after the 2009 series Dahil May Isang Ikaw starring Lorna Tolentino and John Estrada with the addition of the word "Minsan".
Minsan Sana Maulit Muli (Season 2, Episode 49) is named after the 2007 series Sana Maulit Muli starring Tonton Gutierrez with the addition of the word "Minsan", it is also Andi Eigemann's character, Gabrielle "Gabby" Marcelo's final appearance alive as she gets stabbed by Mimi in the back unintentionally.
Minsan Saan Ka Man Naroroon (Season 2, Episode 50) is named after 1999 series Saan Ka Man Naroroon starring Boots Anson-Roa with the word "Minsan".
Minsan May Bukas Pa (Season 2, Episode 51) is named after the 2009 series May Bukas Pa starring Maja Salvador, Martin del Rosario, Lorna Tolentino, John Estrada, Tonton Gutierrez and Dante Rivero with the word "Minsan"
Minsan Basta't Tayong Dalawa (Season 2, Episode 52) is named after the 2009 series Tayong Dalawa starring Coco Martin with the addition of the word "Minsan Basta't"
Minsan Mabunyag Ang Buong Katotohanan (Season 2, Episode 56) is a landmark episode where the truth of the twins identity and the fact that Javier and Alexander are Lora and Joaquin's sons are revealed.
Minsan Lang Kita Inibig (Season 2, Episode 57) is a direct reference to the show's title in past tense and it also marks Joaquin leaving Alondra and Lora leaving Tomas for good.
Minsan Sumuko (Season 2, Episode 59) marks the death of Tonton Gutierrez's character Tomas and it is also when Javier learns the truth of his real mother and finally surrenders.
Minsan May Walang Hanggan (Season 2, Episode 60) is the final episode of Season 2 and the whole series and marks the death of several characters including Alondra (Lorna Tolentino), Diego (Ronnie Lazaro) and Ibon (Jojit Lorenzo). The series ends with Lora, Joaquin, Krista, Alexander, Javier and two baby twin brothers. It is also the highest-rated episode of the series, with a 39.1% audience share earning first place of the night. Walang Hanggan is the next project of the lead actor in ABS-CBN.

References

External links
Official Website
List of Minsan Lang Kita Iibigin episodes at ABS-CBN

Lists of Philippine drama television series episodes
Lists of soap opera episodes